Gunindiri (also spelled Kurnindirri) is an extinct and nearly unattested Australian Aboriginal language of northern Australia.

References

Garawan languages
Extinct languages of the Northern Territory